Bernard V may refer to:

 Bernard V of Armagnac, Count of Armagnac
 Bernard V, Lord of Lippe (c. 1290 – before 1365)
 Bernard V of Lippe (1277–1341), German nobleman, bishop of Paderborn
 Bernard V and Beatrice of Melgueil